Henry Evans (8 July 1857 – 30 July 1920) was an English cricketer who played for Derbyshire between 1878 and 1882.

Evans was born in Stoneyford (near Heanor), Derbyshire the son of Thomas Evans, a farmer. He became a clerk with the Midland Railway. 
 
Evans made his first-class debut for Derbyshire in the 1878 season against Yorkshire. He next played three matches during the 1881 season. In the 1882 season he played one further first-class match, against the touring Australian team.

Evans was a right-arm medium-fast bowler and took 19 wickets at an average of 13.26 and had a best performance of 7-47. He was a right-handed middle order batsman and played 10 innings in 5 matches. His top score was 10 and his average 4.10.

In 1888 Evans moved to Glasgow, as an assistant traffic manager for a railway company. He died in Spondon.

His brother Thomas Evans, played for Derbyshire during the 1883 season.

References

1857 births
1920 deaths
Derbyshire cricketers
English cricketers
People from Amber Valley
Cricketers from Derbyshire